Nikolaus Knüpfer (1609 – 15 October 1655) was a Dutch Golden Age painter.

Biography
Knüpfer was trained in Leipzig, where according to Houbraken he was apprenticed to Emanuel Nysen. He then moved to Magdeburg where he found work making brushes for artists. He stayed there until 1630, and then moved to Utrecht to work with Abraham Bloemaert. He lived with him for two years and then established his own studio in Utrecht, where in 1637 he became a visiting member of the Guild of St. Luke. He worked on the decorations of the castle Kronborg in Denmark, and painted figures in the landscapes of Jan Both and Jan Baptist Weenix. Knüpfer was a successful teacher, whose students were great painters after him, such as Jan Steen, Gabriel Metsu, Ary de Vois, and Pieter Crijnse Volmarijn.

Work
Knüpfer painted small scale paintings with biblical, literary, and mythological themes, in addition to the popular genre works of his day. His figures are often in unusual poses, and painted with flowing lines with white accents.

Master-pupil interpretations of the Book of Tobit

References 

 Cornelis De Bie, Het gulden cabinet van de edel vry schilderconst, Antwerpen 1662, pp. 115–116 (engraved portrait p. 115, Knupfer pinx., Pieter de Jode II sculpt.)
 Filippo Baldinucci's Artists in biographies by Filippo Baldinucci, 1610–1670, p. 197 Google Books

External links 
 

1609 births
1655 deaths
17th-century German painters
Artists from Leipzig
Dutch Golden Age painters
Dutch male painters
German Baroque painters
German male painters
Painters from Utrecht